Schizochitonidae is a family of polyplacophoran molluscs.

References 

Prehistoric mollusc families
Chitons